The secretary of agriculture (Filipino: Kalihim ng Pagsasaka) is the member of the Cabinet of the Philippines in charge of the Department of Agriculture.

List

References

External links
History of the Department of Agriculture: 'DA Then and Now'

 
Agriculture